Irina Pavlovna Khromacheva (born 12 May 1995) is a professional tennis player from Russia.
She has career-high WTA rankings of 89 in singles and 41 in doubles.

Khromacheva was provisionally suspended by the Tennis Integrity Unit for one month from September 2019.

Personal life
Irina was born to Pavel and Natalya Khromacheva, on 12 May 1995 in Moscow. She trained at the Justine Henin Academy in Belgium. Khromacheva states that she doesn't have a favourite surface and likes everything. She started playing tennis at the age of four.

Khromacheva, after her unsuccessful partnership with a Belgian coach, is now coached by Larisa Savchenko in Riga.

Junior career
Khromacheva had a breakthrough on the ITF Junior Circuit in 2008, winning her first title at the Junior Zagreb Open.

In 2009, she won four junior titles and competed for the first time at the French Open and US Open, losing in the first round at both tournaments. 

In 2010, she won four junior titles and became junior world No. 1 on 7 June. At Roland Garros, she lost 3–6, 2–6, in the semifinals to Ons Jabeur. At Wimbledon, she lost in the quarterfinals to Sachie Ishizu, 1–6, 2–6, and at the last junior Grand Slam tournament of the year, the US Open, she lost in the second round to Jabeur, 3–6, 3–6.

In 2011, she reached the junior singles final of the Wimbledon Championships and lost to Ashleigh Barty in two sets; in the junior doubles draw, she reached the semifinals alongside partner Barbora Krejčíková.

Performance timelines

Singles

Doubles

WTA career finals

Doubles: 2 (1 title, 1 runner-up)

WTA Challenger finals

Singles: 2 (1 title, 1 runner-up)

Doubles: 4 (1 title, 3 runner-ups)

ITF Circuit finals

Singles: 29 (18 titles, 11 runner–ups)

Doubles: 46 (31 titles, 15 runner–ups)

Junior Grand Slam finals

Girls' singles: 1 (runner–up)

Girls' doubles: 5 (3 titles, 2 runner–ups)

Notes

References

External links

 
 
 
 

1995 births
Living people
Tennis players from Moscow
Russian female tennis players
French Open junior champions
US Open (tennis) junior champions
Grand Slam (tennis) champions in girls' doubles
Match fixing in tennis
20th-century Russian women
21st-century Russian women